Brianne Moncrief is an American soap opera actress. She was best known for the role of Colby Chandler on All My Children.

The role of Colby Chandler on All My Children was Moncrief's first television job as a series regular, and she was hired to replace actress Ambyr Childers, who had originated the role. She first aired on May 7, 2008, but her contract was not picked up in November 2009. Moncrief has also taken on directing and producing. She lives in Los Angeles.

Filmography
 The Sopranos (episode "Walk Like a Man") (2007) as Lover #2
 All My Children (May 7, 2008 – November 2009) Colby Chandler
 Skeeball (2009) as Claire
 The Other Guys (2010) as Ershon's Assistant
 The Talk Man (2011) as Bree
 How We Got Away with It (2014) as Elizabeth
 13 Cameras (2015) as Claire
14 Cameras (2018) as Claire

References

External links
http://www.soapcentral.com/amc/whowho/theactors/moncrief.php

Brianne Moncrief Theatre Credits

Living people
American soap opera actresses
Fordham University alumni
Actresses from San Jose, California
People from Mission Viejo, California
21st-century American actresses
Year of birth missing (living people)